The 2006 Hansol Korea Open Tennis Championships was a women's  professional tennis tournament played on hard courts. It was the 3rd edition of the tournament, and part of the 2006 WTA Tour. It took place in Seoul, Korea between 25 September and 1 October 2006.

Singles main-draw entrants

Seeds 

 1 Rankings are as of September 18, 2006

Other entrants 

The following players received wildcards into the singles main draw:
  Kim So-jung
  Lee Ye-ra 
  Angelique Widjaja

The following players received entry from the qualifying draw:
  Natalie Grandin   
  Raluca Olaru 
  Anastasia Rodionova 
  Caroline Wozniacki

Withdrawals 
Before the tournament
  Ansley Cargill
  Iveta Benešová 
  Shenay Perry

Doubles main-draw entrants

Seeds 

1 Rankings are as of September 18, 2006

Finals

Singles 

 Eleni Daniilidou defeated  Ai Sugiyama, 6–3, 2–6, 7–6(7–3)
 It was Daniilidou's first title of the year and her fourth overall

Doubles 

 Virginia Ruano Pascual /  Paola Suárez defeated  Chuang Chia-jung /  Mariana Díaz Oliva, 6–2, 6–3
 It was Ruano Pascual's 3rd title of the year and the 37th of her career; it was Suárez's 3rd title of the year and the 42nd of her career

References

External links 
 
 ITF link — (2006 event)

Korea Open
Korea Open
Korea Open (tennis)